Nickel is one of the metals that can form Tutton's salts. The singly charged ion can be any of the full range of potassium, rubidium, cesium, ammonium (NH4), or thallium. As a mineral the ammonium nickel salt, (NH4)2Ni(SO4)2, can be called nickelboussingaultite. With sodium, the double sulfate is nickelblödite Na2Ni(SO4)2 from the blödite family. Nickel can be substituted by other divalent metals of similar sized to make mixtures that crystallise in the same form.

Nickel forms double salts with Tutton's salt structure with tetrafluoroberyllate with the range of cations of ammonia, potassium, rubidium, cesium, and thallium.

Anhydrous salts of the formula M2Ni2(SO4)3, which can be termed metal nickel trisulfates, belong to the family of langbeinites. The known salts include (NH4)2Ni2(SO4)3, K2Ni2(SO4)3 and Rb2Ni2(SO4)3, and those of Tl and Cs are predicted to exist.

Some minerals are double salts, for example Nickelzippeite Ni2(UO2)6(SO4)3(OH)10 · 16H2O which is isomorphic to cobaltzippeite, magnesiozippeite and zinczippeite, part of the zippeite group.

Double hydrides of nickel exist, such as Mg2NiH4.

Double fluorides include the above-mentioned fluoroanion salts, and those fluoronickelates such as NiF4 and NiF6. Other odd ones include an apple green coloured KNiF3·H2O and NaNiF3·H2O, aluminium nickel pentafluoride AlNiF5·7H2O, ceric nickelous decafluoride Ce2NiF10·7H2O, niobium nickel fluoride Ni3H4Nb2F20·19H2O, vanadium nickel pentafluoride VNiF5·7H2O, vanadyl nickel tetrafluoride VONiF4·7H2O, chromic nickelous pentafluoride CrNiF5·7H2O, molybdenum nickel dioxytetrafluoride NiMoO2F4·6H2O, tungsten nickel dioxytetrafluoride NiWO2F4·6H2O and NiWO2F4·10H2O, manganic nickel pentafluoride MnNiF4·7H2O, nickelous ferric fluoride FeNiF5·7H2O.

Nickel trichloride double salts exist which are polymers. Nickel is in octahedral coordination, with double halogen bridges. Examples of this include RbNiCl3, pinkish tan coloured H2NN(CH3)3NiCl3. Other double trichlorides include potassium nickel trichloride KNiCl3·5H2O, yellow cesium nickel trichloride CsNiCl3, lithium nickel trichloride LiNiCl3·3H2O, hyrdrazinium nickel tetrachloride, and nickel ammonium chloride hexahydrate NH4NiCl3·6H2O.

The tetrachloronickelates contain a tetrahedral NiCl42− and are dark blue. Some salts of organic bases are ionic liquids at standard conditions. tetramethylammonium nickel trichloride is pink and very insoluble.
Other tetrachlorides include rubidium nickel tetrachloride, lithium nickel tetrachloride Li2NiCl4·4H2O stable from 23 to 60°, stannous nickel tetrachloride , stannic nickel hexachloride  is tetragonal.

Lithium nickel hexachloride Li4NiCl6·10H2O is stable from 0 to 23°.

Copper nickel dioxychloride 2CuO·NiCl2·6H2O, and copper nickel trioxychloride 3CuO·NiCl2·4H2O.

Cadmium dinickel hexachloride,  crystallises in hexagonal system, dicadmium dinickel hexachloride,  has rhombic crystals, and is pleochroic varying from light to dark green.

Thallic nickel octochloride  is bright green.

Double bromides include the tetrabromonickelates, and also caesium nickel tribromide, CsNiBr3
copper nickel trioxybromide, 3CuO·NiBr2·4H2O
mercuric nickel bromide, Hg2NiBr6, HgNiBr4.
Aqueous nickel bromide reacting with mercuric oxide yields mercuric nickel oxybromide, 
didymium nickel bromide,  is reddish brown (mixture of praseodymium and neodymium)
Lanthanum nickel bromide, 
nickel stannic bromide (or nickel bromostannate) NiSnBr6·8H2O is apple green.

The tetraiodonickelates are blood red coloured salts of the NiI4 ion with large cations. Double iodides known include mercuric nickel hexaiodide 2HgI2•NiI2, mercuric nickel tetraiodide HgI2•NiI2, and lead nickel hexaiodide I2•2NiI2.

The diperiodatonickelates of nickel IV are strong oxidisers, and akali monoperiodatonickelates also are known.

Nickel forms double nitrates with the lighter rare earth elements. The solid crystals have the formula . The metals include La Ce Pr Nd Sm Gd and the non rare earth Bi. Nickel can also be replaced by similar divalent ions, Mg, Mn Co Zn. For the nickel salts melting temperatures range from 110.5° for La, 108.5° for Ce, 108° for Pr, 105.6° for Nd, 92.2° for Sm and down to 72.5° for Gd The Bi salt melting at 69°. Crystal structure is hexagonal with Z=3.  becomes ferromagnetic below 0.393 K. These double nickel nitrates have been used to separate the rare earth elements by fractional crystallization.

Nickel thorium nitrate has formula NiTh(NO3)6. Nickel atoms can be substituted by other ions with radius 0.69 to 0.83 Å. The nitrates are coordinated on the thorium atom and the water to the nickel. Enthalp of solution of the octahydrate is 7 kJ/mol. Enthalpy of formation is -4360 kJ/mol. At 109° the octahydrate becomes , and at 190°  and anhydrous at 215°.
The hexahydrate has Pa cubic structure.

Various double amides containing nickel clusters have been made using liquid ammonia as a solvent. Substances made include red Li3Ni4(NH2)11·NH3 (Pna21; Z = 4; a = 16.344(3) Å; b = 12.310(2) Å; c = 8.113(2) Å v=1631 D=1.942), and Cs2Ni(NH2)4•NH3 (P21/c; Z = 4; a =9.553(3) Å; b = 8.734(3) Å; c = 14.243(3) Å; β = 129.96(3)° V=910 D=2.960). These are called amidonickel compounds. Yet others include Li4Ni4(NH2)12·NH3, Na2Ni(NH2)4, orange red Na2Ni(NH2)4•2NH3, Na2Ni(NH2)4•NH3, K2Ni(NH2)4•0.23KNH2, and Rb2Ni(NH2)4•0.23RbNH2.

Nickel dihydrogen phosphide (Ni(PH2)2) can form orange, green or black double salts KNi(PH2)3) that crystallise from liquid ammonia. They are unstable above -78 °C, giving off ammonia, phosphine and hydrogen.

References

Nickel compounds
Double salts